The Negro Mountain Tunnel is a tunnel located in Negro Mountain in Somerset County, Pennsylvania. It was built by New York Central Railroad as part of the proposed but never completed South Pennsylvania Railroad, which over time became known as "Vanderbilt's Folly". The tunnel is located near milepost 116.7 on the Pennsylvania Turnpike where it is ten miles east of the Quemahoning Tunnel (also built for the railroad but never used by the Turnpike), 16 miles east of the Laurel Hill Tunnel (used by the Turnpike but bypassed in 1964), and seven miles west of the Allegheny Mountain Tunnel currently used by the Turnpike.

When the newly formed Pennsylvania Turnpike Commission bought the South Pennsylvania Railroad's right-of-way in 1937, the Turnpike considered using the Negro Mountain Tunnel, but instead bypassed it, making it one of six tunnels bypassed along the highway, including Quemahoning and the original Allegheny Mountain Tunnel due to structural concerns, plus three used by the Turnpike but later abandoned.

External links 
 
 Photos of the tunnel

Railroad tunnels in Pennsylvania
Transportation buildings and structures in Somerset County, Pennsylvania
Pennsylvania Turnpike Commission